Golam Kabud or Galam Kabud may refer to:
 Golam Kabud-e Olya (disambiguation)
 Golam Kabud-e Sofla (disambiguation)